Kadakkavoor  is a developing special grade  town consisting central government postal office, railway station, sub treasury, police station, electricity board, telecom office and banks; Thiruvananthapuram district in the state of Kerala, India.

This commercial and residential area is situated about 32 km north from the capital city Thiruvananthapuram and 33 km south of Kollam. The area has a number of shops, banks, hospitals, sub treasury, commercial establishments, educational institutions and religious centers.

Demographics
At the 2001 India census, Kadakkavoor had a population of 25,362 with 12,199 males and 13,163 females.

Transportation

Kadakavur Railway Station is an important station between Thiruvananthapuram and Kollam. Thiruvananthapuram International Airport is the nearest airport.

Regular buses are available for Attingal, Varkala, Paravur, Chirayinkeezhu, Anchuthengu, Vakkom, Nilakkamukku, Mananakku, Anathalavattom, Kollampuzha, Kaikkara, Nedunganda, Plavazhikom, Vilabhagom, Vettur, Keezhattingal, Perumkulam, Palamkonam, Thoppichantha, Thottikkallu, Alamcodu and Venjaramoodu.

References

 

Villages in Thiruvananthapuram district